La Falda is a town in the province of Córdoba, Argentina, located  from Córdoba and 800 km from Buenos Aires.

La Falda lies at the foot of two small mountains (Cerro El Cuadrado and Cerro La Banderita), and it is part of an important tourist circuit of the province (the Punilla Valley). The Punilla Department includes other tourist sites like Villa Carlos Paz, Los Cocos, La Cumbre and Capilla del Monte.

La Falda is home to the historic "Eden Hotel",(now a public park and historic museum, which was visited by Albert Einstein.

The main street and hub of activity for the town is "Avenue Eden".

Main sights
Attractions in La Falda include the 7 Cascades, a natural park also which hosts a large public swimming pool. "Tatu Carreta" is an Ecological Park and Zoo c. 8 km from the downtown on the route toward Córdoba. It is a drive thru "safari" style zoological experience with  local and exotic animal species. The area has been used as a special stage for Rally Argentina.

Gallery

See also

 List of largest cuckoo clocks

External links
  
  
 All About La Falda 
 Villa Carlos Paz and Valle de Punilla 
 Ecological Park & Zoo 
 La Falda Tango Festival Information 

Populated places in Córdoba Province, Argentina
Tourism in Argentina
Rally Argentina
Cities in Argentina
Argentina
Córdoba Province, Argentina